Albert William Baird Fawcett (15 May 1890 – 4 March 1970) was an Australian rules footballer who played with Melbourne and Essendon in the Victorian Football League (VFL).

Notes

External links 

Essendon past player profile
Demonwiki profile

1890 births
1970 deaths
Australian rules footballers from Victoria (Australia)
Melbourne Football Club players
Essendon Football Club players
Footscray Football Club (VFA) players